Ulugurella is a monotypic genus of Tanzanian sheet weavers containing the single species, Ulugurella longimana. It was first described by R. Jocqué & N. Scharff in 1986, and is only found in Tanzania.

See also
 List of Linyphiidae species (Q–Z)

References

Linyphiidae
Monotypic Araneomorphae genera
Spiders of Africa